Sennoy (masculine), Sennaya (feminine), or Sennoye (neuter) is the name of several inhabited localities in Russia.

Modern localities
Urban localities
Sennoy, Saratov Oblast, a work settlement in Volsky District of Saratov Oblast

Rural localities
Sennoy, Astrakhan Oblast, a settlement in Akhmatovsky Selsoviet of Narimanovsky District in Astrakhan Oblast; 
Sennoy, Chelyabinsk Oblast, a settlement in Sukhorechensky Selsoviet of Kartalinsky District in Chelyabinsk Oblast
Sennoy, Krasnodar Krai, a settlement in Sennoy Rural Okrug of Temryuksky District in Krasnodar Krai; 
Sennoy, Volgograd Oblast, a khutor in Sennovsky Selsoviet of Mikhaylovsky District in Volgograd Oblast
Sennoye, Sevsky District, Bryansk Oblast, a selo in Dobrovodsky Rural Administrative Okrug of Sevsky District in Bryansk Oblast; 
Sennoye, Zlynkovsky District, Bryansk Oblast, a village under the administrative jurisdiction of Vyshkovsky Settlement Administrative Okrug in Zlynkovsky District of Bryansk Oblast; 
Sennoye, Republic of Crimea, a selo in Belogorsky District of the Republic of Crimea
Sennoye, Krasnoyarsk Krai, a village in Turovsky Selsoviet of Abansky District in Krasnoyarsk Krai
Sennoye, Kursk Oblast, a khutor in Verkhneapochensky Selsoviet of Sovetsky District in Kursk Oblast
Sennoye, Orenburg Oblast, a selo in Senninsky Selsoviet of Perevolotsky District in Orenburg Oblast
Sennoye, Smolensk Oblast, a village in Arnishitskoye Rural Settlement of Ugransky District in Smolensk Oblast
Sennoye, Voronezh Oblast, a selo in Karachunskoye Rural Settlement of Ramonsky District in Voronezh Oblast
Sennaya, Kaluga Oblast, a village in Meshchovsky District of Kaluga Oblast
Sennaya, Kostroma Oblast, a selo in Chukhlomskoye Settlement of Chukhlomsky District in Kostroma Oblast; 
Sennaya, Pskov Oblast, a village in Novorzhevsky District of Pskov Oblast
Sennaya, Sverdlovsk Oblast, a village in Staroartinsky Selsoviet of Artinsky District in Sverdlovsk Oblast
Sennaya, Zabaykalsky Krai, a selo in Nerchinsky District of Zabaykalsky Krai

Alternative names
Sennaya, alternative name of Sennoy, a settlement in Sennoy Rural Okrug of Temryuksky District in Krasnodar Krai;

Notes